Chipman Forest Avenue School is a school located in Chipman, New Brunswick. It is located in the Anglophone West School District.

References

Schools in Queens County, New Brunswick
High schools in New Brunswick